Clarence C. Moore (1904-January 24, 1979) was an engineer and minister at Radio Station HCJB (subsequently known as HCJB Global and now known as Reach Beyond) with primary transmitters in Quito, Ecuador.He went on to found International Radio and Electronics Corporation (IREC) in Elkhart, Indiana which was renamed Crown International in the 1960s at the suggestion of his wife Ruby. Crown International manufactured electronic devices including power amplifiers. loudspeakers and tape recorders.  The audio division was acquired by Harman International in March 2000.
Moore was an amateur radio operator with call signs of W9LZX and HC1JB.  He developed and patented the cubical quad antenna, patented as US 2,537,191.. 

Moore also owned domestic radio stations WXAX and WCMR.

References

External links

Amateur radio people
Protestant missionaries in Ecuador
1904 births
1979 deaths
20th-century American engineers
American expatriates in Ecuador